Magdala (sometimes erroneously spelled Magdalla) is a former settlement and current locality about 20 km north of Gawler in South Australia. There was formerly a church and Lutheran school, but all that remains is the cemetery. Magdala is on the road from Templers to Hamley Bridge. It was established in the 1890s and had a school from 1903 to 1940.

References